The Anton Gogala Farmstead is a historic farmstead in Krain Township, Minnesota, United States.  For over a century it remained a small-scale dairy farm operated by a Slovene American family, and contains traditionally constructed buildings and structures dating back to 1875, including several built of logs.  The farm was listed on the National Register of Historic Places in 1982 for its local significance in the themes of agriculture, architecture, and exploration/settlement.  It was nominated as the best surviving illustration of Stearns County's settlement-era farmsteads of the late 19th century, and for the Gogala family's key role in establishing the Slovene American community of St. Anthony a mile to the north.

See also
 National Register of Historic Places listings in Stearns County, Minnesota

References

1875 establishments in Minnesota
Buildings and structures in Stearns County, Minnesota
Farms on the National Register of Historic Places in Minnesota
Log buildings and structures on the National Register of Historic Places in Minnesota
National Register of Historic Places in Stearns County, Minnesota
Slovene-American culture in Minnesota